The office of the Minister of State for Entrepreneurs is a ministerial post of the Albanian Government responsible for communicating with entrepreneurs in the business community. The current minister is Edona Bilali.

See also
List of companies of Albania

References

Entrepreneurs